Costas Menegakis (born in Montreal, Quebec) is a businessman, an entrepreneur and a former Canadian politician, who represented the federal electoral district of Richmond Hill from 2011 to 2015.

Personal life

Menegakis is of Greek descent born to parents who immigrated to Canada in the 1950s. He was educated in Montreal, Quebec and is a graduate of Concordia University's Faculty of Commerce. He moved to Markham, Ontario in 1985 and currently resides in Richmond Hill, Ontario. Menegakis founded Tilwood Inc., a product fulfillment & logistics company in Richmond Hill in 1988. He is the Chief Executive Officer of Tilwood Inc. currently operating in Brampton, Ontario. Menegakis has served in a volunteer capacity for the following non-profit organizations over the past 30 years that offer services to families and particularly to youth, seniors and persons with special needs. He has served on the Board of Directors of Accessible Media Inc., the Metropolitan Toronto Police Chief's Community Advisory Council, the Empire Club of Canada, the Greek Community of Toronto, the Hellenic Home for the Aged and the World Council for Hellenes Abroad. Menegakis is a member of the Richmond Hill Board of Trade, the Royal Canadian Legion Branch 375, the Rotary Club of York and the Oak Ridges Lions Club. Menegakis was awarded Her Majesty's Queen Elizabeth II Gold and Diamond Jubilee Medals and is a recipient of Rotary International's Paul Harris Fellow recognition. 

Menegakis speaks three languages: English, French and Greek.

Federal politics

Member of Parliament

In 2011 Costas Menegakis was elected to Canada's 41st Parliament as the Member of Parliament for Richmond Hill and in 2013, Menegakis was appointed Parliamentary Secretary to the Minister of Citizenship and Immigration by Prime Minister Stephen Harper. During his time in office, Menegakis was a member on the Canadian House of Commons Standing Committees for Citizenship and Immigration, Procedures and House Affairs, Government Operations and Estimates and Official Languages.

2015 federal election
In the 2015 federal election, Menegakis contested in the new Aurora—Oak Ridges—Richmond Hill riding. Menegakis was defeated by Liberal candidate Leona Alleslev by just 1,093 votes.

2019 federal election
In February 2018, Menegakis was again elected as the Conservative candidate for Aurora—Oak Ridges—Richmond Hill, but later stepped down as the party's nominee when Alleslev crossed the floor to join the Conservative Party. Two weeks later, Menegakis was acclaimed as the Conservative candidate in his former riding of Richmond Hill.

2021 federal election
Menagakis was nominated as the Conservative Candidate in Richmond Hill and was defeated in a rematch of the 2019 federal election by the incumbent MP, Majid Jowhari 47.7% to 38.8%.

Electoral record

References

External links
Costas Menegakis (copy archived October 2013)

1959 births
Anglophone Quebec people
Canadian people of Greek descent
Conservative Party of Canada MPs
Living people
Members of the House of Commons of Canada from Ontario
People from Richmond Hill, Ontario
Politicians from Montreal
21st-century Canadian politicians
Concordia University alumni